This is a list of Finnish MPs who were imprisoned for political reasons in Russia.

Jägers
Future MPs from the Jäger Movement were imprisoned or deported to Siberia for the crime of Lese Majesty during the period of the Grand Duchy of Finland.

Stalin's Purges

References

Lists of members of the Parliament of Finland